Chrysochroa is a genus of "jewel" or metallic wood-boring beetles, typical of the tribe Chrysochroini. Most of the many species are native to Southeast Asian nations such as Malaysia, Indonesia, and the Philippines. However, a good number are found in India, one (Chrysochroa fulgidissima ssp. alternans) in Japan, (Chrysochroa coreana) in Korea, and one (Chrysochroa lepida) in Africa.

Species

 Chrysochroa akiyamai Lander, 1989
 Chrysochroa andamanensis Saunders, 1867
 Chrysochroa annamensis Bourgoin, 1924
 Chrysochroa aurotibialis Deyrolle, 1864
 Chrysochroa baudoni Descarpentries, 1963
 Chrysochroa blairi Lander, 1989
 Chrysochroa bloetei Théry, 1935
 Chrysochroa browni Saunders, 1872
 Chrysochroa buqueti (Gory, 1833)
 Chrysochroa caroli Perroud, 1853
 Chrysochroa castelnaudii Deyrolle, 1862
 Chrysochroa celebensis Obenberger, 1932
 Chrysochroa celebigena Obenberger, 1935
 Chrysochroa chongi Endo, 1992
 Chrysochroa coelicolor Obenberger, 1942
 Chrysochroa corbetti Kerremans, 1893
 Chrysochroa coreana Han et Park, 2012
 Chrysochroa cuprascens (Waterhouse, 1881)
 Chrysochroa edwardsii Hope, 1843
 Chrysochroa elegans Thunberg, 1784
 Chrysochroa fallaciosa Théry, 1923
 Chrysochroa fulgidissima (Schönherr, 1817)
 Chrysochroa fulminans (Fabricius, 1787)
 Chrysochroa gestroi Kurosawa, 1978
 Chrysochroa holstii Waterhouse in Waterhouse & Gahan, 1890
 Chrysochroa ignita (Linnaeus, 1758)
 Chrysochroa intermedia Lander, 1992
 Chrysochroa ixora Gory, 1840
 Chrysochroa jasienskii Hołyński, 2009
 Chrysochroa klapaleki Obenberger, 1924
 Chrysochroa landeri Hołyński, 2009
 Chrysochroa limbata Nonfried, 1891
 Chrysochroa ludekingii Snellen von Vollenhoeven, 1864
 Chrysochroa mirabilis Thomson, 1878
 Chrysochroa miribella Obenberger, 1939
 Chrysochroa mniszechii Deyrolle, 1861
 Chrysochroa ocellata (Fabricius, 1775)
 Chrysochroa parryi Saunders, 1867
 Chrysochroa perrotetii Guérin-Méneville, 1840
 Chrysochroa pseudoludekingii Lander, 1992
 Chrysochroa purpureiventris Deyrolle, 1864
 Chrysochroa rajah Gory, 1840
 Chrysochroa rogeri Dupont, 1832
 Chrysochroa rugicollis Saunders, 1866
 Chrysochroa sakaii Ohmomo, 1999
 Chrysochroa sarasinorum Flach, 1887
 Chrysochroa saundersii Saunders, 1866
 Chrysochroa semperi Saunders, 1874
 Chrysochroa similis Saunders, 1867
 Chrysochroa toulgoeti Descarpentries, 1982
 Chrysochroa unidentata (Fabricius, 1775)
 Chrysochroa viridisplendens Théry, 1898
 Chrysochroa vittata (Fabricius, 1775)
 Chrysochroa wallacei Deyrolle, 1864
 Chrysochroa waterstradti Théry, 1923
 Chrysochroa weyersii Deyrolle, 1864

References 

  1. Descarpentries (A.), 1982 - Une nouvelle espèce de Chysochroa, Nouvelle Revue d'Entomologie, 12, 3.
  2. Kerremans (C.), 1908-1909 - Monographie der Buprestides. Vol 3. Chrysochroini-Chalcophorites (pars).
  3. Lander (T.), 1989 - A propos du genre Chysochroa Solier, Bulletin de la Société Sciences Nat, 64, p. 1.
  4. Lander (T.), 1992 - The Beetles of the World, volume 16. Chrysochroini 1. (Buprestidae), Sciences Nat, Venette.

External links 
 Buprestidae of Indo-Malaysia, Indochina and The Philippines An entomological page with a focus on Jewel Beetles
 Chrysochroa at insectoid.info
 

Beetles of Asia
Buprestidae genera